Clit 45 was an American punk rock band from Long Beach, California, United States, that formed in 1996. The band played traditional, fast punk, influenced by the Adolescents, Poison Idea and Bad Religion. Their second and third albums were published by BYO Records and distributed by Cargo Records in Europe.  They toured with the Casualties, the Briefs, New Mexican Disaster Squad, Complete Control, the Riffs, the Krays, Defiance, Dropkick Murphys, the Virus, the Unseen, Bad Religion, and A Global Threat. Their last show was in Portland, OR in October 2006.  After a yearlong hiatus, Clit 45 announced that they had officially disbanded on Christmas Day, 2007 via their MySpace page.

Following their disbandment, Clit 45 played a handful of lives shows between 2011 and 2019. On stage in 2019 Oklahoma they announced that they would never play live again.

Lead Singer Dave is now playing in a punk rock band called The Fiends!.

Members
Vocals - Dave
Guitar - Mike
Bass - Rufio
Guitar - Rico

Discography
Albums
2000: Tales from the Clit (ADD Records)
2005: Self-Hate Crimes (BYO Records)
2006: 2, 4, 6, 8... We're the Kids You Love to Hate (BYO Records)

EPs
1996: Demo
1998: Broken Glass (Riot Squad)
1999: Straight Outta Long Beach (ADD Records)
2002: Your Life To Choose (Punkcore Records)
2003: Kids Aren't Alright (Ghetto Blast)

References

External links
 Clit 45 at BYO Records
 Clit 45 on Myspace

Street punk groups
Hardcore punk groups from California
BYO Records artists